Devlin "Dev" Reeves (born March 6, 1967) is an American former professional soccer defender who played in Europe and the United States.

Youth
Born in Quincy, Illinois, Reeves graduated from Quincy Senior High School and Quincy University. Reeves was voted as one of the top 25 players ever to play at Quincy University. During his senior year Reeves was selected to play in the Adidas Senior Bowl as one of the nations top 30 players. Reeves was inducted into the Quincy Sr. High School Hall of Fame in 1995 and into the Quincy University Sports Hall of Fame in 2000. Reeves played his youth and college soccer under the guidance of legendary coach Jack Mackenzie.

Professional
Reeves was the 1989 #1 draft pick of the Chicago Power of the National Professional Soccer League. However, he signed as an undrafted free agent with the Cleveland Crunch of the Major Indoor Soccer League in July 1989. Despite playing thirty-nine games for the Crunch and placing 3rd on the MISL Rookie of the Year balloting, the team released him in June 1990. He then moved to Europe where he played for Jonsereds IF of the Södra Swedish First Division. In the summer of 1992, he played for the St. Louis Atoms in the amateur Budweiser Premier League. In December 1992, he signed with the St. Louis Ambush of the National Professional Soccer League. He played two winter indoor seasons with the Ambush. In the spring of 1993, Reeves signed with the Dallas Sidekicks of the Continental Indoor Soccer League for the summer indoor season. The Sidekicks won the 1993 CISL championship with Reeves scoring the Sidekicks first goal in the championship series against the San Diego Sockers. He remained with the Sidekicks through the 1995 season, but lost fourteen games of the 1994 season with a fracture to his vertebrae. Reeves sat out the 1994–1995 NPSL season. The Sidekicks waived him on July 22, 1995. In October 1995, Reeves rejoined the Ambush. He played only five games due to injuries before retiring.

Post-playing career
Reeves is the president of IAC The Sports Group which is a sales and marketing firm located in Frisco, Texas. He also serves as the color analyst for the Dallas Sidekicks and Dallas Cup television broadcasts on Time Warner Sports Channel. The Dallas Cup is regarded as the top youth soccer tournament in the world. The likes of Rooney, Beckham, Dempsey, Chicharito, and of late Adnan Januzaj, Jesse Lingard and Ross Barkley have all played in the Dallas Cup. Reeves has hosted the "Dev Reeves All-Star Soccer Camp" in his hometown of Quincy since 1986.

References

External links
 Profile on Dallas Sidekicks fan site
 Pictures of Dev Reeves
 Legends Tribute Match
 FC Dallas Official Blog
 MISL stats

American color commentators
American expatriate soccer players
American expatriate sportspeople in Sweden
American soccer players
American sports businesspeople
Cleveland Crunch (original MISL) players
Continental Indoor Soccer League players
Dallas Sidekicks (CISL) players
Expatriate footballers in Sweden
Association football commentators
Association football defenders
Jonsereds IF players
Major Indoor Soccer League (1978–1992) players
National Professional Soccer League (1984–2001) players
Sportspeople from Quincy, Illinois
Quincy Hawks men's soccer players
Soccer players from Illinois
St. Louis Ambush (1992–2000) players
1967 births
Living people